The 1968 French Covered Court Championships was a tennis tournament played on indoor carpet courts. It was the last edition of the French Covered Court Championships before it was taken over by the Paris Open. It took place at the Palais omnisports de Paris-Bercy in Paris, France, and was held from 12 February through 18 February 1968.

Milan Holeček and Nell Truman won the singles titles.

Finals

Men's singles

 Milan Holeček defeated  Bob Carmichael 6–4, 10–8, 3–6, 6–3

Women's singles
 Nell Truman defeated  Évelyne Terras 6–4, 6–1

Men's doubles
 Patrice Beust /  Daniel Contet defeated  Bob Carmichael /  Ismail El Shafei 3–6, 10–8, 6–2, 19–17

Women's doubles
 Rosie Reyes /  Monique Salfati defeated  Janine Lieffrig /  Johanne Venturino 3–6, 6–0, 6–3

Mixed doubles
 Gerald Battrick /  Nell Truman defeated  Jean-Pierre Courcol /  Évelyne Terras 6–2, 1–6, 6–3

See also
 Paris Open

References

External links 
 ATP tournament profile